Let's Live for Today is the second studio album by the American rock band The Grass Roots, released in July 1967 by Dunhill Records. A new group was brought in for this album which included Creed Bratton, Rick Coonce, Warren Entner and Rob Grill. It features their first top-ten hit by the same name, "Let's Live for Today". The bulk of the compositions are by group creators Sloan and Barri, but the new group was allowed to compose four songs and was given some input in the studio instrumentation. The other A and B side singles released were "Depressed Feeling" (Non-LP B-Side of "Let's Live for Today"), "Things I Should Have Said" b/w "Tip of My Tongue", and "Wake Up, Wake Up" b/w "No Exit". The album charted at #75.

Songs
Unlike much of the group's later material, Let's Live for Today contains no horn or string arrangements. The songs reflected a new psychedelic direction for the group, but there are still folk elements throughout the record. The band was allowed some input of their compositions and instrumentation in the recordings. The songs "Tip Of My Tongue" and "Where Were You When I Needed You" were the same recordings done with the previous group that Sloan and Barri hired as The Grass Roots, but with rerecorded vocals by the new lineup. The charting success of the album and its singles led to greater confidence in the new group's contributions by Dunhill. This led to even more input and a heavier direction in their psychedelic music for their next album titled Feelings.

Artwork and packaging
The original release of Let's Live for Today is on Dunhill ABC as mono or stereo. The front cover was designed by Phil Schwartz.

Early US LP jackets list the song "Wake Up, Wake Up" before "Things I Should Have Said" on the back cover, though the label of the record lists them in the correct order. However, the Canadian issue of the album does in fact use this different track listing.

Track listing

Personnel
The Grass Roots
Rob Grill – vocals, bass, composer
Warren Entner – guitar, vocals, composer
Creed Bratton – lead guitar, vocals, composer
Rick Coonce – drums, percussion, Dixie Cup

Additional personnel
Steve Barri – co-producer, composer
P. F. Sloan – co-producer, composer, guitar, bass
Chuck Britz – engineer
"Bones" Howe – percussion
Hal Blaine – drums, percussion
Larry Knechtel – keyboard instruments
Joe Osborn – guitar, bass
Bobby Ray – guitar, bass

References 

1967 albums
The Grass Roots albums
Dunhill Records albums
Albums arranged by Jimmie Haskell
Albums produced by Steve Barri
Albums produced by P. F. Sloan